Montrose-Ghent is a census-designated place (CDP) in Summit County, Ohio, United States, composed of the unincorporated communities of Montrose and Ghent.  The population was 5,261 at the 2000 census. It is part of the Akron Metropolitan Statistical Area. Despite sharing a commercial district with Fairlawn, the regions are administratively separate.

Geography
Montrose-Ghent is located at  (41.150996, -81.638039).

Demographics

As of the census of 2000, there were 5,261 people, 1,920 households, and 1,591 families residing in the CDP. The population density was 558.4 people per square mile (215.6/km2). There were 1,987 housing units at an average density of 210.9/sq mi (81.4/km2). The racial makeup of the CDP was 96.52% White, 0.87% African American, 0.08% Native American, 1.84% Asian, 0.06% from other races, and 0.63% from two or more races. Hispanic or Latino of any race were 0.57% of the population.

There were 1,920 households, out of which 34.7% had children under the age of 18 living with them, 76.8% were married couples living together, 3.9% had a female householder with no husband present, and 17.1% were non-families. 14.0% of all households were made up of individuals, and 5.2% had someone living alone who was 65 years of age or older. The average household size was 2.70 and the average family size was 2.99.

In the CDP the population was spread out, with 25.1% under the age of 18, 4.4% from 18 to 24, 19.3% from 25 to 44, 35.3% from 45 to 64, and 15.9% who were 65 years of age or older. The median age was 46 years. For every 100 females there were 100.3 males. For every 100 females age 18 and over, there were 98.5 males.

The median income for a household in the CDP was $102,353, and the median income for a family was $118,906. Males had a median income of $75,000 versus $43,897 for females. The per capita income for the CDP was $56,423. None of the families and 0.7% of the population were living below the poverty line, including no under eighteens and 1.8% of those over 64.

References

Census-designated places in Summit County, Ohio